George L. Carder House, also known as Boxwood Hill, is a historic home located at Castleton, Rappahannock County, Virginia. It was built about 1833, and is a two-story, Federal style brick dwelling on a limestone foundation. It features a pair of front entrances and an original kitchen built into the cellar.  The property also includes a contributing one-room log house, log shed, and wood-framed barn.

It was added to the National Register of Historic Places in 2004.

References

Houses on the National Register of Historic Places in Virginia
Federal architecture in Virginia
Houses completed in 1833
Houses in Rappahannock County, Virginia
National Register of Historic Places in Rappahannock County, Virginia